VisionIntoArt (VIA) is a non-profit new music and interdisciplinary arts production company in New york City. The group was founded in 1999 by Nora Kroll-Rosenbaum and Paola Prestini, while they were students at the Juilliard School.

History 

VIA’s first performance was in a dance studio at Juilliard in 1998 by a group of dancers, musicians, actors, and filmmakers who sought to create performance work that investigated world culture. They have since performed and toured globally at venues such as Lincoln Center, Symphony Space, the Brooklyn Academy of Music, the Whitney Museum, and several international festivals.  During the first ten years, the group toured and performed with artists across a wide array of mediums such as poet Roger Bonair-Agard, artist Erika Harrsch, and videographer Carmen Kordas. VIA has recently restructured the organization, acting as a production organization and less as a performance ensemble. 2009 saw the first collaboration between Beth Morrison Projects, Opera on Tap, and VisionIntoArt for a production of 21c Liederabend, an evening of song by 21st-century composers. And in 2011, the organization announced its first grants program under the name The Balsamo Career Grant as well as a residency program produced in coordination with Under the Volcano, a writers workshop located in Tepoztlán, Mexico.

Discography 

Sounds (2009)
Traveling Songs (2009)

References 

Arts organizations based in New York City
Arts organizations established in 1999
1999 establishments in New York City